The olive-crowned yellowthroat (Geothlypis semiflava) is a species of bird in the family Parulidae.
It is found in Colombia, Costa Rica, Ecuador, Honduras, Mexico, Nicaragua, and Panama.
Its natural habitats are subtropical or tropical moist shrubland and heavily degraded former forest.

References

olive-crowned yellowthroat
Birds of the Tumbes-Chocó-Magdalena
olive-crowned yellowthroat
olive-crowned yellowthroat
Taxonomy articles created by Polbot